Ugborough is a village and civil parish in South Hams in the English county of Devon. It lies south of Dartmoor,  from the A38 road, near to the town of Ivybridge.

The parish, which had a population of 1,884 in 2011, includes a number of settlements other than the village such as Bittaford, Wrangaton (which once had a railway station), Cheston, and Moorhaven Village. To the southeast of Ugborough, still within the parish, is Fowlescombe Manor.

The bulk of the village encircles a village square on the south side of which is the large parish church dedicated to St Peter, with a history going back to 1121, when it was part of Plympton Convent.

Modern day Ugborough has a small junior school and pre-school, a village hall. It holds a fair every year in July, with traditional games and stalls. A public bus service runs through Ugborough, as does a bus to the local secondary school at Ivybridge. The village has had a football team for many years which hosts three teams spanning ages from under-10s to under-16s. The under-16s finished third in the Pioneer Youth League in 2019. In the village hall, which doubles as a pre-school, various entertainments are held, mainly in the summer months, ranging from live music to themed evenings. More recently  a Youth Group has been set up, catering to many of the village's children.

See also
Redlake Tramway

References

External links

A brief history of the village
Ugborough and Bittaford Pre-school

Villages in South Hams
Civil parishes in South Hams